Upton and Innishannon railway station was on the Cork and Bandon Railway in County Cork, Ireland.

History

Located near the village of Upton, the station opened as Brinney on 1 August 1849. It was renamed Upton and Brinney on 1 November 1851. It was further renamed Upton on 1 July 1883, and Upton and Innishannon from 1 July 1894.

It was the scene of the Upton Train Ambush on 15 February 1921 when the Irish Republican Army mounted an attack on a train carrying British soldiers. The action was a disaster for the IRA; three of its volunteers were killed and two wounded. Six British soldiers were wounded, three seriously. At least six civilian passengers were killed and ten wounded in the crossfire.

Regular passenger services were withdrawn on 1 April 1961.

Routes

Further reading

References

Disused railway stations in County Cork
Railway stations opened in 1863
Railway stations closed in 1961